Étang Long is a lake in Ariège, France.

Long